There are a number of places in Mexico named after famous people.

Aguascalientes

 Adolfo López Mateos (Aguascalientes) – Adolfo López Mateos
 Calvillo – José Calvillo (founder)
 Cosío – Felipe Cosío, Governor
 Pabellón de Arteaga – José María Artega, 19th century national hero
 Pabellón de Hidalgo (Aguascalientes) – Miguel Hidalgo
San Francisco de los Romo – Francis of Assisi
San José de Gracia, Aguascalientes – Joseph Villaseñor, son of Ferdinand VII of Spain
 Villa Juárez (Aguascalientes) – Benito Juárez
 Villa Jesús Terán (Aguascalientes) – Jesús Terán Peredo (governor)

Baja California

 Alberto Oviedo Mota (Baja California) – Dr. Alberto Oviedo Mota (1882–1953)
 Guadalupe Victoria, Baja California – Guadalupe Victoria
San Quintín Municipality – Quentin of Amiens (d. c. AD 287)
 Venustiano Carranza, Baja California – Venustiano Carranza, President of Mexico
 Vicente Guerrero, Baja California – Vicente Guerrero
 Villa de Juárez (Ensenada) – Benito Juárez, President of Mexico

Baja California Sur

 Melitón Albáñez Domínguez, Baja California Sur – General Melitón Albañez (1880–1917)
 Puerto Adolfo López Mateos (Baja California Sur) – Adolfo López Mateos

Campeche

 Alfredo V. Bonfil (Campeche) – Alfredo Vladimir Bonfil, a Peasant leader
 Bolonchén de Rejón – Manuel Crescencio García Rejón (1799–1849), jurist
 Emiliano Zapata (Campeche) – Emiliano Zapata
 Escárcega – Francisco Escarcega Marquez (1896–1938), a native from Tlaxcala who fought in a revolution
 Ingeniero Eugenio Echeverría Castellot (Calakmul, Campeche) – Eugenio Echeverría Castellot (1918–1999), governor of Campeche
 Iturbide (Campeche) – Agustín de Iturbide
 Juárez (Campeche) – Benito Juárez
 Villa Madero (Campeche) – Francisco I. Madero

Chiapas
Ángel Albino Corzo – Ángel Albino Corzo (1816–1875), liberal politician, governor (1856–1860)
 Bejucal de Ocampo – Melchor Ocampo, politician, senator
 Benemérito de las Américas – Benito Juárez
 Berriozábal – Felipe Berriozábal, military and politician
 Capitán Luis Ángel Vidal – Captain Luis Vidal, hero of the Battle of Chiapa de Corzo
 Chiapa de Corzo – Ángel Albino Corzo
 Dr. Manuel Velasco Suárez (Chiapas) and El Porvenir de Velasco Suárez – Manuel Velasco Suárez, neurologist and former governor of Chiapas in 1970 to 1976
 Dr. Rodulfo Figueroa (Chiapas) – Mexican poet and physician Dr. :es:Rodulfo Figueroa Esquinca (1866–1899)
 Efrain A. Gutierrez (Chiapas) – Efrain Antonio Gutierrez (1894–1985), Governor of Chiapas in 1936 to 1940
 Emiliano Zapata, Chiapas – Emiliano Zapata
 Francisco León, Chiapas – Francisco Leon, Governor of Chiapas
 Frontera Hidalgo – Miguel Hidalgo, Father of the fatherland
 Joaquín Amaro (Chiapas) – Gral. Joaquín Amaro
 Juárez, Chiapas – Benito Juárez, president of Mexico
 Larráinzar – Manuel Larráinzar, politician
 Marqués de Comillas – Claudio López, 2nd Marquess of Comillas
 Mazapa de Madero – Francisco I. Madero, president of Mexico
 Miguel Alemán (Chiapas) – Miguel Alemán Valdés
 Montecristo de Guerrero – Vicente Guerrero
 Motozintla de Mendoza – Ismael Mendoza Sanchez (1882–1920)
 Nicolás Ruiz – 19th-century Governor of Chiapas, Nicolás Ruiz
 Ocozocoautla de Espinosa – Luis Espinosa (1880–1926)
 Rayón, Chiapas – Ignacio López Rayón
Rincón Chamula San Pedro – Peter the Apostle
 San Andrés Larráinzar – Saint Andrew and Manuel Larráinzar
 San Cristóbal de las Casas – Bartolomé de las Casas, 15th century Spanish writer
San Fernando, Chiapas – Ferdinand III of Castile (d. 1252)
San Lucas, Chiapas – Luke the Evangelist
Santiago el Pinar – James the Great (d. AD 44)
 Tuxtla Gutiérrez – :es:Joaquín Miguel Gutiérrez (1796–1838), Conservative politician, independence leader
 Unión Juárez, Chiapas – Benito Juárez
 Venustiano Carranza, Chiapas – Venustiano Carranza, President of Mexico
 Villa Corzo – Ángel Albino Corzo

Chihuahua

 Ahumada Municipality – Miguel Ahumada Governor of Chihuahua
 Aldama Municipality, Chihuahua – Juan Aldama
 Allende Municipality, Chihuahua – Ignacio Allende
 Aquiles Serdán Municipality – Aquiles Serdán
 Batopilas de Manuel Gómez Morín – Manuel Gómez Morín, National Action Party's founder
 Cárdenas – Lázaro Cárdenas, President
 Chínipas de Almada – Francisco R. Almada (1896-1989), a historian and two-time governor of Chihuahua.
 Ciudad Cuauhtémoc, Chihuahua – Cuauhtémoc
 Ciudad Juárez – Benito Juárez, President
 Colonia LeBaron – Alma Dayer LeBaron Sr., Joel LeBaron and Ervil LeBaron, one of a Mormon fundamentalists leaders 
Coronado Municipality – :es:Esteban Coronado (1832-1860), liberal soldier in Reform War
Cuauhtémoc Municipality – Cuauhtémoc, Tlatoani of Tenochtitlan (1520-1521)
Dr. Belisario Domínguez Municipality – Belisario Domínguez (1863-1913), Senator
Galeana – Hermenegildo Galeana (1762-1814), insurgent leader
 Gómez Farías Municipality, Chihuahua – Valentín Gómez Farías, President
 Gran Morelos – José María Morelos (1765-1815), priest and insurgent leader
 Guerrero, Chihuahua – Vicente Guerrero, President
 Hidalgo del Parral – Miguel Hidalgo, priest and insurgent leader
Ignacio Zaragoza Municipality – Ignacio Zaragoza (1829-1862), general who won the Battle of Puebla
Jiménez Municipality – José Mariano Jiménez (1781-1811), engineer and soldier in the Mexican War of Independence
López Municipality – Octaviano López, a republican soldier killed in the battle of Talamantes on 1860.
 Manuel Benavides – Manuel Benavides Armendáriz (1852-1913), a native revolutionary who died in combat on 1913
 Mariano Matamoros – Mariano Matamoros, priest and insurgent leader
Morelos Municipality – José María Morelos
Ocampo Municipality – Melchor Ocampo (1814-1861), lawyer and liberal politician
 Ojinaga – Manuel Ojinaga Castañeda (1834–1865), Governor of Chihuahua
Práxedis G. Guerrero Municipality – :es:Práxedis G. Guerrero (1882-1910), anarchist and philosopher
Riva Palacio Municipality – Vicente Riva Palacio (1832-1896), liberal politician
San Francisco de Borja Municipality and two other municipalities named San Francisco – Francis of Assisi (1182-1226)
San Francisco Javier de Satevó – Francis of Assisi
Santa Bárbara Municipality – Saint Barbara (d. AD 3rd century)
Santa Isabel Municipality – Elizabeth, mother of John the Baptist 
 Valle de Zaragoza – Ignacio Zaragoza

Coahuila
 Abasolo, Coahuila – Mariano Abasolo
 Adolfo López Mateos, Coahuila – Adolfo López Mateos, President
 Allende, Coahuila – Ignacio Allende
Arteaga – José María Arteaga Magallanes, Governor of Querétaro (1858)
 Ciudad Acuña – Manuel Acuña, poet
 Cuatrocienegas de Carranza – President Venustiano Carranza, who was born in Cuatrocieneagas in 1859
 Diana Laura Riojas (Coahuila) – Diana Laura Riojas de Colosio (1957–1994), Luis Donaldo Colosio's widow
 Escobedo, Coahuila – General Mariano Escobedo
 Francisco I. Madero, Coahuila – Francisco I. Madero, President
 Flores Magon, Coahuila – Ricardo Flores Magón, Jesús Flores Magón and Enrique Flores Magón
 General Cepeda – Victoriano Cepeda Camacho, (1826–1892), a general and a governor of Coahuila
 Guerrero, Coahuila – Vicente Guerrero, President
 Hidalgo, Coahuila – Miguel Hidalgo
 Jiménez, Coahuila – José Mariano Jiménez
 Juárez Municipality, Coahuila – Benito Juárez, President
 Lamadrid Municipality, Coahuila – Francisco Lamadrid
 Lázaro Cárdenas, Coahuila – Lázaro Cárdenas, President
 Lucio Blanco, Coahuila – Lucio Blanco, revolutionary
Matamoros Municipality – Mariano Matamoros (1770–1814), priest and independence leader
 Monclova – Melchor Portocarrero, 3rd Count of Monclova
Morelos Municipality – José María Morelos (1765–1815),  priest and independence leader
 Nava, Coahuila – Pedro de Nava, Commander general of New Spain
 Ocampo, Coahuila – Melchor Ocampo
 Ramos Arizpe – Miguel Ramos Arizpe, priest and politician
San Buenaventura Municipality, Coahuila – Giovanni di Fidanza (1221–1274), Franciscan scholastic theologian and philosopher
San Pedro Municipality, Coahuila – Saint Peter
 Santa Rosa de Múzquiz – Saint Rose of Lima and Melchor Múzquiz, President
 Viesca – José María y Viesca, Governor of Coahuila and Nuevo León
 Zaragoza, Coahuila – Ignacio Zaragoza

Colima

 Arturo Noriega Pizano – Prof. Arturo Noriega Pizano (1915–1994), governor of Colima
 Cuauhtémoc, Colima – Cuauhtémoc
 Madrid, Colima – the Madrid family who are owners on their place at a time
 Pueblo Juárez – Benito Juárez, President
 Venustiano Carranza – Venustiano Carranza, President
 Villa de Álvarez – General Manuel Álvarez, first governor

Durango

 Adolfo López Mateos (Aguinaldo) – Adolfo López Mateos
 Arturo Martinez Adame, Durango – Arturo Martinez Adame (1896–1970), lawyer and politician
 Canelas, Durango – Captain Mateo Canelas
 Ciudad Guadalupe Victoria and Victoria de Durango – Guadalupe Victoria, First President
 Ciudad Lerdo – Miguel Lerdo de Tejada
 Coneto de Comonfort – Ignacio Comonfort
 Domingo Arrieta  – General Domingo Arrieta León, Mexican general and statesman
 Dr. Francisco Castillo Nájera – Francisco Castillo Nájera, diplomat and politician
 Francisco I. Madero, Durango – Francisco I. Madero, President of Mexico
 General Simón Bolívar – Simón Bolívar, South American liberator
 Gómez Palacio, Durango – Francisco Gómez Palacio, writer
 José Ramón Valdés – Prof. José Ramón Valdés (1888–1975), politician
Ocampo Municipality – Melchor Ocampo
 Pastor Rouaix – Pastor Rouaix (1874–1950), politician
 Raul Madero – General Raul Madero (1888–1982), a former President's brother
San Bernardo Municipality, Durango – Bernard of Corleone (1605-1667)
 San Juan de Guadalupe – Saint John the Baptist and Our Lady of Guadalupe
 San Juan del Río del Centauro del Norte, Durango – Pancho Villa
 San Luis del Cordero – Don Luis del Cordero (Founder)
San Pedro del Gallo Municipality – Saint Peter
Santa Clara Municipality, Durango – Clare of Assisi (1194-1253)
Santiago Papasquiaro Municipality – James the Great
 Tlahualilo de Zaragoza – Ignacio Zaragoza
 Vicente Guerrero, Durango – Vicente Guerrero
 Villa Hidalgo, Durango – Miguel Hidalgo
 Villa Ocampo, Durango – Melchor Ocampo

Guanajuato

 Abasolo, Guanajuato – Mariano Abasolo
 Álvaro Obregón – Álvaro Obregón
 Ciudad Manuel Doblado – Manuel Doblado, liberal politician, governor (1854–1858 and 1860–1861), Minister of Foreign Affairs (1861)
 Colonia Juan José Torres Landa – Juan José Torres Landa (1911 -1980), Governor of Guanajuato
 Comonfort – Ignacio Comonfort, President of Mexico
 Cortazar, Guanajuato – Luis Cortazar y Rabago
 Doctor Mora – José María Luis Mora Lamadrid, father of the Mexican liberalism
 Dolores Hidalgo – Miguel Hidalgo
 Ocampo, Guanajuato – Melchor Ocampo
 Purísima del Bustos – Hermenegildo Bustos, painter
San Diego de la Unión – James, brother of Jesus
 San Felipe, Guanajuato – King Philip II of Spain
San Francisco del Rincón – Saint Francis
 San José Iturbide – Saint Joseph and Agustín de Iturbide, Emperor of Mexico (1822-1823)
 San Miguel de Allende – Ignacio Allende
Santa Catarina, Guanajuato – Catherine of Alexandria
 Santa Cruz de Juventino Rosas – Juventino Rosas, musician
Santiago Maravatío – James the Great
 Villagrán, Guanajuato – Julián Villagran

Guerrero
Free and Sovereign State of Guerrero – Vicente Guerrero, independence leader and second President
 Acapulco de Juárez – Benito Juárez
 Alcozauca de Guerrero – Vicente Guerrero
 Atoyac de Álvarez – Juan Álvarez
 Buenavista de Cuéllar – General Rafael A. Cuellar, Governor
 Ciudad Altamirano, Guerrero – Ignacio Manuel Altamirano
Chilpancingo de los Bravo – Leonardo Bravo (1764–1812), general during the independence movement, and his sons Nicolás Bravo (1786–1854), independence leader and 11th President; and Víctor Bravo, independence leader 
Coahuayutla de José María Izazaga – :es:José María Izazaga, insurgent
 Coyuca de Benítez – María Faustina Benítez, wife of Juan Álvarez
 Coyuca de Catalán – Nicolás Catalán
 Eduardo Neri – Eduardo Neri Reynoso (1887–1973)
Florencio Villarreal – Col. Florencio Villarreal, who drafted the Plan of Ayutla
General Canuto A. Neri – Canuto A. Neri, a Zapatist general
 General Heliodoro Castillo – a Zapatist general, Heliodoro Castillo Castro
 Huitzuco de los Figueroa – named after the Figueroa family, such as Rubén Figueroa Figueroa, (1908–1991), governor of Guerrero, Ignacio Figueroa (1834–1873), liberal military, and Prof. Francisco Figueroa Mata (1870–1936), teacher and governor of Guerrero
 Ixcateopan de Cuauhtémoc – Cuauhtémoc
 José Joaquín de Herrera (municipality) – José Joaquín de Herrera, President
 Juan R. Escudero (municipality) – Juan Ranulfo Escudero (1890–1923), a syndicalist leader, worker and statesman
La Unión de Isidoro Montes de Oca – Isidoro Montes de Oca, insurgent
 Leonardo Bravo (municipality) – General Leonardo Bravo, an Independence hero
Mártir de Cuilapán – Vicente Guerrero Saldaña
Pedro Ascencio Alquisiras – Pedro Ascencio Alquisiras, insurgent
San Luis Acatlán – Louis IX of France
San Marcos Municipality, Guerrero – Mark the Evangelist
 Taxco de Alarcón – Juan Ruiz de Alarcón, writer
 Tecpán de Galeana (municipality) – Hermenegildo Galeana
 Tepecoacuilco de Trujano – Valerio Trujano
 Tixtla de Guerrero (municipality) – Vicente Guerrero
 Tlapa de Comonfort – Ignacio Comonfort
 Tlalixtaquilla de Maldonado – Caritino Maldonado Pérez, Governor
Zihuatanejo de Azueta – :es:José Azueta (1895–1914), Artillery Tactical Lieutenant during the Battle of Veracruz of 1914 
 Zirándaro de los Chávez – Rodolfo Chávez Sánchez (1895–1995) and Dr. Ignacio Chávez Sánchez

Hidalgo
Free and Sovereign State of Hidalgo – Miguel Hidalgo y Costilla, (1753–1811), leader of the Mexican independence movement
 Cuautepec de Hinojosa – Pedro de Hinojosa
 Emiliano Zapata, Hidalgo – Emiliano Zapata
 Francisco I. Madero Municipality, Hidalgo – Francisco I. Madero, President
 Huasca de Ocampo, Tepeji del Río de Ocampo – Melchor Ocampo
 Huejutla de Reyes – Antonio Reyes Cabrera (1831–1866)
 Javier Rojo Gómez (Hidalgo) – Lic. Javier Rojo Gómez, Governor of Hidalgo
 Manuel Ávila Camacho (Hidalgo) – Manuel Ávila Camacho, President
 Nicolás Flores, Hidalgo – General Nicolás Flores Rubio (1873–1934)
 Omitlán de Juárez, Juárez, Hidalgo, Zapotlán de Juárez – Benito Juárez, President
 Pachuca de Soto – Manuel Fernando Soto, lawyer
 Progreso de Obregón – Álvaro Obregón, President
San Agustín Tlaxiaca – Augustine of Hippo
San Bartolo Tutotepec – Bartholomew the Apostle
San Salvador, Hidalgo – Jesus
Santiago de Anaya and Santiago Tulantepec – James the Great
 Tenango de Doria – Juan Cristodomo Doria, first governor
 Tezontepec de Aldama – Juan Aldama
 Tula de Allende – Ignacio Allende
 Tulantepec de Lugo Guerrero – José Lugo Guerrero (1897–1980), Governor
 Zacualtipan de Ángeles – General Felipe Ángeles
 Zapotlán de Juárez – Benito Juárez

Jalisco
 Acatlán de Juárez, Valle de Juárez – Benito Juárez
 Ahualulco de Mercado – José María Mercado
 Atemajac de Brizuela – Coronel Miguel Brizuela
 Autlán de Navarro – revolutionary Paulino Navarro
 Bolaños, Jalisco – Toribio de Bolanos, conquistator
 Casimiro Castillo – peasant leader Casimiro Castillo Vigil (1883–1925)
 Cañadas de Obregón – Álvaro Obregón
 Ciudad Guzmán – :es:Gordiano Guzmán (1789-1854), insurgent
 Cuautitlán de García Barragán – General Marcelino García Barragán (1895–1979), Governor of Jalisco
 Degollado – Santos Degollado
 Emiliano Zapata, Jalisco – Emiliano Zapata
 Encarnación de Díaz – Porfirio Díaz, Mexican dictator
 Gómez Farías, Jalisco – Valentín Gómez Farías
 Juan Gil Preciado (Jalisco) – Prof. Juan Gil Preciado (1909–1999), governor of Jalisco
 Lagos de Moreno – Pedro Moreno (soldier) (1775–1817), insurgent
 Lázaro Cárdenas, Jalisco – Lázaro Cárdenas
 Puerto Vallarta – Ignacio Luis Vallarta (Governor)
 San Cristóbal de la Barranca – Saint Christopher
 San Diego de Alejandría – Saint James the Major
 San Ignacio Cerro Gordo – Ignatius of Loyola (1491–1556)
 San Juan de los Lagos – John the Baptist
 San Juanito de Escobedo – John the Apostle and Antonio Escobedo, governor (1844)
 San Julián, Jalisco – Julian of Antioch (d. c. AD 308)
 San Marcos, Jalisco – Mark the Evangelist
 San Martín de Bolaños – Martin of Braga (AD 520–580)
 San Martín de Hidalgo – Miguel Hidalgo
 San Sebastián del Oeste – Saint Sebastian (AD 256-288)
 Santa María de los Ángeles and Santa María del Oro, Jalisco – Mary
 Talpa de Allende – Ignacio Allende
 Teocuitatlán de Corona, Villa Corona – Ramón Corona
 Tepatitlán de Morelos – José María Morelos
 Tlajomulco de Zúñiga – General Eugenio Zúñiga
 Valle de Juárez – Benito Juárez
 Villa Guerrero, Jalisco – Vicente Guerrero
 Villa Hidalgo, Jalisco – Miguel Hidalgo
 Yahualica de González Gallo – José González Gallo (Governor)
 Zapotitlán de Vadillo – Basilio Vadillo (1895–1935)
 Zapotlán del Rey – King Philip II of Spain

Mexico (state)
Acolman de Nezahualcóyotl – Nezahualcoyotl (1402–1472), poet
 Almoloya de Alquisiras – Pedro Ascencio Alquisiras, an Independence hero
 Almoloya de Juárez, Amecameca de Juárez, Chicoloapan de Juárez and Chiconcuac de Juárez – Benito Juárez, President
Apaxco de Ocampo – Melchor Ocampo, politician and philosopher
 Atizapán de Zaragoza – Ignacio Zaragoza
 Atlacomulco de Fabela, Tlazala de Fabela – Isidro Fabela, writer, politician and academician
 Chapa de Mota – conquistator Jeronimo Ruiz de la Mota
 Ciudad López Mateos – Adolfo López Mateos, President
 Ciudad Nezahualcóyotl – Nezahualcóyotl
 Coacalco de Berriozábal – Felipe Berriozábal, Governor of State of Mexico
 Donato Guerra, State of Mexico – Donato Guerra, Soldier
 Ecatepec de Morelos and Morelos, State of Mexico – José María Morelos
 Jilotepec de Molina Enríquez – Andrés Molina Enríquez
 Luvianos – Cristobal Luvianos (founder)
 Melchor Ocampo, State of Mexico – Melchor Ocampo
 Otumba de Gómez Farías – Valentín Gómez Farías
 Rayón, State of Mexico – Ignacio López Rayón, an Independence hero
San Antonio la Isla – Anthony of Padua (1195–1231)
San Felipe del Progreso – Philip the Apostle
San José del Rincón – Saint Joseph
 San José Villa de Allende – Saint Joseph and Ignacio Allende, an Independence hero
San Martín de las Pirámides – Martin of Braga
San Mateo Atenco – Matthew the Apostle
San Simón de Guerrero – Simon the Zealot and Vicente Guerrero, president (1839)
Santo Tomás de los Plátanos – Thomas the Apostle
 Temascalcingo de José Maria Velasco – José María Velasco Gómez, painter
Texcoco de Mora – José María Luis Mora (1794–1850), priest and liberal idealist
 Tlalnepantla de Baz – Dr. Gustavo Baz Prada, Revolutionary and governor
 Toluca de Lerdo – Sebastián Lerdo de Tejada, President
 Tultitlán de Mariano Escobedo – General Mariano Escobedo 
 Valle de Bravo – Nicolás Bravo, President
 Villa Guerrero, State of Mexico – Vicente Guerrero, President
 Villa Victoria – Guadalupe Victoria, President

Mexico City

Álvaro Obregón
 Álvaro Obregón, Mexico City – Álvaro Obregón, who was assassinated in that area in 1928
Abraham M. González – Abraham González, former governor of Chihuahua (1912–1913)
Alfonso XIII – Alfonso XIII, king of Spain (1886–1931)
Francisco Villa – Pancho Villa, leader of División del Norte (1913–1920)
Galeana – Hermenegildo Galeana, (1762–1814), hero of the Mexican War of Independence
Hidalgo and Miguel Hidalgo – Miguel Hidalgo y Costilla (1753–1811), Father of the Nation
José María Pino Suárez – José María Pino Suárez, (1869–1913), Vice President of Mexico (1911–1913)
Margarita Masa de Juárez – Margarita Maza (1826–1871), First Lady of Mexico (1858–1864 and 1867–1871)
Mártires de Tacubaya – The soldiers and civilians who were shot as a result of their defeat in the Battle of Tacubaya on April 11, 1859.
Merced Gómez – Merced Gomez, Sr., bullfighter (1884–1923)
Ponciano Arriaga – José Ponciano Arriaga Mejía (1811–1865), lawyer and radical liberal politician
Reacomodo Valentín Gómez Farías – Valentín Gómez Farías, five-time President of Mexico (1830s, 1846–1847)

Azcapotzalco
U. H. Francisco Villa – Pancho Villa
U. H. Lázaro Cárdenas – Lázaro Cárdenas, President of Mexico (1934–1940)
U. H. Lerdo de Tejada – Sebastián Lerdo de Tejada, President of Mexico (1872–1876)
U. H. Miguel Hidalgo – Miguel Hidalgo
U. H. Rosendo Salazar – Rosendo Salazar Álamo (1888–1971), journalist and writer, promoter of organized labor

Benito Juárez
 Benito Juárez, Mexico City – Benito Pablo Juárez García, President of Mexico (1858–1872)
General Pedro María Anaya – Pedro María de Anaya, general and twice-president (1847 and 1848)
Josefa Ortiz de Domínguez – Josefa Ortiz de Domínguez ″La Corregidora″, (1768–1829), hero of the Mexican War of Independence
Merced Gómez – Merced Gomez, Sr.
Miguel Alemán – Miguel Alemán González (1884–1929), general in the Mexican Revolution
Niños Héroes – Niños Héroes: Juan de la Barrera, Juan Escutia, Francisco Márquez, Agustín Melgar, Fernando Montes de Oca, and Vicente Suárez, cadets who died at the Battle of Chapultepec in 1847

Coyoacán
Adolfo Ruiz Cortines – Adolfo Ruiz Cortines, President (1952–1958)
Emiliano Zapata – Emiliano Zapata Salazar (1879–1919), leader of the Liberation Army of the South
Espartaco – Spartacus (c. 111–71 BC), gladiator who led a slave rebellion against the Roman Republic (73–71 BC)
Nueva Díaz Ordaz – Gustavo Díaz Ordaz, President (1964–1970)

Cuajimalpa
 Cuajimalpa de Morelos – José María Teclo Morelos Pérez y Pavón (1765–1815), leader of Mexican War of Independence
Adolfo López Mateos – Adolfo López Mateos, President (1958–1964)

Cuauhtémoc
 Cuauhtémoc, Mexico City – Cuauhtémoc, Tlatoani of Tenochtitlan (1520–1521)
Condesa – María Magdalena Dávalos de Bracamontes y Orozco, Countess of Miravalle (1701–1777)
Colonia Doctores – Dr. Lavista and Dr. Río de la Loza
Colonia Guerrero – Vicente Ramón Guerrero Saldaña, Independence leader and 2nd President (1829)
Colonia Juárez, Mexico City – Benito Juárez
Colonia Maza – José Maza, owner of La Vaquita Ranch
Colonia Morelos – José María Morelos
Colonia Paulino Navarro – Paulino Navarro, soldier in the Mexican Revolution

Gustavo A. Madero
 Gustavo A. Madero, Mexico City – Gustavo Adolfo Madero González (1875–1913), Francisco I. Madero's brother

Miguel Hidalgo
 Miguel Hidalgo, Mexico City – Miguel Hidalgo

Venustiano Carranza
 Venustiano Carranza, Mexico City – Venustiano Carranza, leader of the Constitutional Army during the Revolution, Head of State (1914–1916) and President of Mexico (1916–1920)
Colonia Valle Gómez – Modesto del Valle and Rafael B. Gomez, real estate developers (1890s)

Michoacán
Free and Sovereign State of Michoacán de Ocampo – Melchor Ocampo, liberal politician
 Álvaro Obregón Municipality – President Álvaro Obregón
 Arteaga, Michoacán – José María Arteaga, 19th century national hero
 Coalcomán de Vázquez Pallares – Natalio Vázquez Pallares (1913–1981), Mexican lawyer
 Cojumatlán de Régules – Nicolás de Régules, a general who fought against the French intervention in Mexico
Carácuaro de Morelos – José María Morelos
 Ciudad Hidalgo, Michoacán – Miguel Hidalgo
 Epitacio Huerta – General Epitacio Huerta (1827–1904)
 Gabriel Zamora – Gabriel Zamora (1897–1933), Farm work and civil rights activist
Jiménez, Michoacán – Mariano Jiménez, twice governor of Michoacán
 Juárez Municipality, Michoacán – President Benito Juárez
 Lázaro Cárdenas, Michoacán – President Lázaro Cárdenas
 Marcos Castellanos – Father Marcos Castellanos, an Independence hero
 Morelia – José María Morelos
 Múgica Municipality – Francisco J. Múgica (1884–1954)
Ocampo Municipality – Melchor Ocampo
 Paracho de Verduzco – José Sixto Verduzco, an Independence hero
 Pastor Ortiz – Pastor Ortiz Avila (1902–1930)
 Quiroga, Michoacán – Vasco de Quiroga, Bishop of Michoacan
San Juan Huetamo de Núñez – Saint John; Purépecha people, Spanish, African slaves, and Andalusians; Nuño de Guzmán (1490–1558)
Jacona de Plancarte – Francisco Plancarte y Navarrete (1856–1920), archbishop born in Zamora, Michoacán
Jiménez, Michoacán – Mariano Jiménez, governor of Michoacán (1885–1892)
Lázaro Cárdenas, Michoacán – Lázaro Cárdenas del Río, president (1934–1940)
Santa Ana Maya – Saint Anne
Santa Clara del Cobre (a.k.a. Salvador Escalante) – Clare of Assisi and General Salvador Escalante Pérez Gil, Revolutionary leader
San Lucas Municipality, Michoacán – Saint Luke
Tiquicheo de Nicolás Romero – Nicolás Romero, liberal general during the Reform War
 Venustiano Carranza, Michoacán – José Venustiano Carranza De La Garza, president (1916–1920)
 Villa Madero – Francisco I. Madero, president (1911–1913)
 Villa Victoria – Guadalupe Victoria, first president (1824–1829)
 Villamar Municipality – Eligio Villamar, hero of the Mexican–American War.
Vista Hermosa de Negrete – José María Martínez Negrete, landowner and benefactor
Zamora de Hidalgo – Miguel Hidalgo

Morelos
State
Morelos – José María Morelos (1765–1815), priest and independence leader
Municipalities and municipal seats

 Ciudad Ayala – Francisco Ayala (1760–1812), independence leader
 Emiliano Zapata, Morelos (previously called San Francisco Zacualpan and San Vicente Zacualpan) – Emiliano Zapata (1879–1919), revolutionary general (Francis of Assisi (1182–1226) and Saint Vincent) 
Santo Domingo Hueyapan – Saint Dominic
Jantetelco de Matamoros – Mariano Matamoros (1770–1814), priest and independence leader
 Jojutla de Juárez – Benito Juárez (1806–1872), president (1858–1872)
Jonacatepec de Leondro Valle – Leandro Valle Martínez (1833–1861), general and liberal politician
Tlaltizapán de Zapata – Emiliano Zapata 
Totolapan de Montes de Oca – Fernando de Montes de Oca (c. 1830–1847), one of the Niños Héroes
Yautepec de Zaragoza – Ignacio Zaragoza (1829–1862), led the defense in the Battle of Puebla (1862)
Zacatepec of Hidalgo – Miguel Hidalgo y Costilla (1753–1811), priest and Father of the Nation

Colonies, neighborhoods, and towns
Adolfo Ruiz Cortines, Cuernavaca – Adolfo Ruiz Cortines (1889–1973), president (1952–1958) 
Amatlán de Quetzalcóatl, Tepoztlán – Quetzalcoatl, prehispanic god
Antonio Barona, Cuernavaca – :es:Antonio Barona Rojas (1886–1915), revolutionary general 
Ángel Bocanegra, Tepoztlán – José María Bocanegra, third president (December 1829)
Alfredo V. Bonfil, Tlaquiltenango; and  Alfredo V. Bonfil, Yautepec – :es:Alfredo V. Bonfil (1936–1973), politician and peasant leader
Benito Juárez, Cuernavaca – Benito Juárez
Diego Ruiz, Zapata – General Diego Ruiz, who was killed in a battle in 1915
Dr. José G. Parres, Jiutepec – José G. Parres (1888–1949), politician
Emiliano Zapata, Zacualpan – Emiliano Zapata 
Felipe Neri, Tlalnepantla – Felipe Neri (1884–1914), revolutionary general
Gloria Almada de Bejarano, Cuernavaca – :es:Gloria Bejarano Almada (b. 1952), Costa Rican politician and First Lady of Costa Rica (1990–1994)
Guadalupe Victoria, Zacualpan – Guadalupe Victoria (1786–1843), first president (1824–1829)
López Mateos, Cuautla and Adolfo López Mateos, Cuernavaca – Adolfo López Mateos (1909–1969), president (1958–1964) 
José López Portillo, Cuernavaca – José López Portillo (1920–2004), president (1976–1982) 
Juan Morales, Yecapixtla – Juan Esteban Morales, general who led the defense during the Battle of Veracruz in 1914
Margarita Maza de Juárez, Cuernavaca – Margarita Maza (1826–1871), First Lady of Mexico (1858–1864 and 1867–1871)
Mariano Escobedo, Zacualpan – Mariano Escobedo (1826–1902), liberal general
Narciso Mendoza and Niño Artillero, Cuautla – :es:Narciso Mendoza (1800–1888), eleven-year-old soldier during the Siege of Cuautla
Otilio Montaño, Cuautla, and Otilio Montaño, Jiutepec – Otilio Montaño Sánchez (1887–1917), revolutionary general
Paraíso Montessori, Cuernavaca – Maria Montessori (1870–1952), Italian educator
Rancho Cortes – Hernán Cortés (1485–1547), Spanish conquistador and 1st Marquess of the Valley of Oaxaca
Ricardo Flores Magón, Cuernavaca – Ricardo Flores Magón (1874–1922), anarchist and social reformer
Rodolfo López de Nava, Cuernavaca – Rodolfo López de Nava, Governor of Morelos (1952–1958)
Rubén Jaramillo, Temixco – Rubén Jaramillo (1900–1962), peasant leader
San Antón Analco, Cuernavaca – Anthony of Padua (1195–1231), Franciscan priest and friar
San Lorenzo Chamilpa, Cuernavaca – Saint Lawrence (AD 225-258)
San Nicolás Galeana, Zacatepec – Hermenegildo Galeana (1762–1814), independence leader
Santa María Ahuacatitlán – Mary
Shaya Michan, Xoxocotla – Shaya Michan, naturalist doctor
Tres Marias, Huitzilac – The Three Marys present at the Crucifixion
Valle de Vázquez and Lorenzo Vázquez, Tlalnepantla – :es:Lorenzo Vázquez Herrera (1879–1917), revolutionary general
Vicente Estrada Cajigal, Cuernavaca – Vicente Estrada Cajigal, first modern governor (1930–1932)
Vicente Guerrero, Cuernavaca – Vicente Guerrero (1782–1831), independence leader and second president (1829)
Villa Nicolás Zapata, Totolapan – :es:Nicolás Zapata Aguilar (1906–1979), politician 

Other
Benito Juárez, Xochitepec – Benito Juárez
Cliserio Alanís, San Gaspar, Jiutepec – Cliserio Alanís, revolutionary general; Caspar, one of the Three Kings
Estadio Agustín "Coruco" Díaz – Agustín "Coruco" Díaz (1935–1960), soccer player
Estadio Isidro Gil Tapia – Isidro Gil Tapia, soccer player
Estadio Mariano Matamoros – Mariano Matamoros
Francisco Villa, Xochitepec – Pancho Villa (1878–1923), general, leader of División del Norte
General Mariano Matamoros Airport – Mariano Matamoros
Borda Garden, Cuernavaca – José de la Borda (c. 1699–1778), a miner in Taxco, New Spain
La Hacienda de San Gabriel Las Palmas, Amacuzac – Archangel Gabriel
La hacienda de Santa Lucía, Temoac – Saint Lucy
Melchor Ocampo park, Cuernavaca – Melchor Ocampo (1814–1861), liberal politician
Miguel Hidalgo, Xochitepec – Miguel Hidalgo y Costilla
Nueva Morelos, Xochitepec – José María Morelos
San José Vista Hermosa (ex-hacienda), Jojutla – Saint Joseph
Siqueiros park, Cuernavaca – David Alfaro Siqueiros (1896–1974), muralist
Unidad Deportiva Fidel Velázquez, Cuernavaca – Fidel Velázquez Sánchez (1900–1997), union leader

Nayarit
 El Nayar – Tribal chief, Nayar
 Ruiz, Nayarit – Mariano Ruiz Montanez (1846–1932), soldier
 Salvador Allende (Nayarit) – Dr. Salvador Allende, Chilean president who visited in Mexico in 1972
San Blas, Nayarit – Saint Blaise
San Pedro Lagunillas – Saint Peter
Santa María del Oro, Nayarit – Mary
Santiago Ixcuintla – James the Great (died AD 44)
 Villa Hidalgo (Nayarit) – Miguel Hidalgo y Costilla (1753-1811), Father of the Nation
 Villa Juárez, Nayarit – Benito Juárez, liberal president (1858-1872)

Nuevo León
 Abasolo, Nuevo León – Mariano Abasolo
 Alfredo V. Bonfil (Paras) – Alfredo Vladimir Bonfil (1936–1973), a peasant leader
 Allende, Nuevo León – Ignacio Allende
 Aquiles Serdán (Vallecillo) – Aquiles Serdán, revolutionary
 Aramberri, Nuevo León – José Silvestre Aramberri
 Cadereyta Jiménez, Nuevo León – José Mariano Jiménez
 Bustamante, Nuevo León – Anastasio Bustamante
 Cerralvo Municipality – Rodrigo Pacheco, 3rd Marquess of Cerralvo
 Ciénega de Flores – Don Pedro Flores
 Congregación Calles – Plutarco Elías Calles
 Doctor Arroyo – Dr. José Francisco Arroyo y Anda
 Doctor Coss – José María Cos, politician
 Doctor González, Nuevo León – José Eleuterio González, Governor and founder of the UANL
Galeana, Nuevo León – Hermenegildo Galeana (1762–1814), a hero of the Mexican War of Independence
 García, Nuevo León – Joaquín García (Governor)
General Bravo – Nicolás Bravo (1786–1854), 11th President of Mexico and hero of the War of Independence and the Mexican–American War
 General Escobedo – Mariano Escobedo
 General Treviño – Jerónimo Treviño (1835–1914)
General Zaragoza – Ignacio Zaragoza (1829–1862), Mexican military commander of the 19th century
General Zuazua – Juan Zuazua Esparza, who fought in the Reform War
Hidalgo and Sabinas Hidalgo – Miguel Hidalgo
 Iturbide, Nuevo León – Agustín de Iturbide
 Juárez, Nuevo León – Benito Juárez
 Lampazos de Naranjo, Nuevo León – Francisco Naranjo
Los Aldamas – Brothers Juan Aldama and Ignacio Aldama, heroes of the Mexican War of Independence
Los Herreras – Brothers Herrera, heroes of the battle of the bridge of San Bernabe during the War of Independence
Melchor Ocampo – Melchor Ocampo, liberal thinker and diplomat
Mier y Noriega – Fray José Servando Teresa de Mier Noriega y Guerra (1765–1827), priest who helped draft the Mexican Constitution of 1824
 Monterrey – Gaspar de Zúñiga, 5th Count of Monterrey
 Morones Prieto (Nuevo León) – Dr. Ignacio Morones Prieto (1899–1974), physician and governor
 Predio Alfonso Martínez Domínguez (Nuevo Leon) - Alfonso Martínez Domínguez, governor
 Salinas Victoria – Guadalupe Victoria, first president (1824-1829)
 San Pedro Garza García – St. Peter and Genaro Garza García (1837–1904), governor
 San Nicolás de los Garza – Saint Nicholas of Myra and Pedro de la Garza, benefactor of the town
Santa Catarina – Catherine of Alexandria
Santiago – Saint James the Greater

Oaxaca

Acatlán to Rojas de Cuauhtémoc
 Acatlán de Pérez Figueroa – Luis Pérez Figueroa
 Ánimas Trujano, Oaxaca – Valerio Trujano
 Ayoquezco de Aldama – Juan Aldama
 Capulalpam de Méndez – Miguel Méndez Hernández, initiator of Mexican Liberal Party
 Chiquihuitlán de Benito Juárez – Benito Juárez
Cuilapan de Guerrero – Vicente Guerrero, who was executed here in 1831
Ejutla de Crespo – Manuel Sabino Crespo (executed 1815), who fought with Morelos during the War of Independence
 Eloxochitlán de Flores Magón – Ricardo Flores Magón
Evangelista Analco – A woman named Ana who founded the town in 1660
Guadalupe de Ramírez – Francisco M. Ramírez (1866-1955), judge
 Guevea de Humboldt – Alexander von Humboldt (1769–1859), Prussian naturalist and explorer who visited the town
 Gustavo Díaz Ordaz (Oaxaca) – Gustavo Díaz Ordaz
Huajuapan de León – Antonio de León, who fought in the War of Independence
Huautla de Jiménez – General Mariano Jiménez, first governor of the state of Oaxaca (1884) and founder of the town
Ixtlán de Juárez – Benito Juárez, who was baptized in the church of St Thomas in Ixtlán
 Juchitán de Zaragoza – Ignacio Zaragoza
La Compañia – Named for the Jesuits
 Mariscala de Juárez – Benito Juárez, originally called Mariscala de Iturbide in honor of Agustín de Iturbide
 Mártires de Tacubaya – Liberal soldiers and civilians who were executed after the Battle of Tacubaya (1859)
 María Lombardo de Caso (Oaxaca) – María Lombardo de Caso (1905–1964), a Mexican narrator
 Matías Romero, Oaxaca – Matías Romero, politician and diplomat
 Miahuatlán de Porfirio Díaz, Santa María Chilapa de Diaz – Porfirio Díaz, seven-time President (1877–1880 and 1884–1911)
 Municipality of Guelatao de Juárez – Benito Juárez, who was born there in 1806
 Nejapa de Madero – Francisco I. Madero
 Oaxaca de Juárez – Benito Juárez
 Ocotlán de Morelos – José María Morelos
 Putla Villa de Guerrero – Vicente Guerrero
 Rojas de Cuauhtémoc – Cuauhtémoc

San Agustín to San Simón
San Agustín Amatengo and seven other municipalities named San Agustín – Augustine of Hippo (354–430), bishop, theologian and father of the Latin Catholic Church.
San Andrés Cabecera Nueva and 14 other municipalities named San Andrés – Andrew the Apostle
San Antonino Castillo Velasco – Anthony of Padua and José María Castillo Velasco, who was born here in 1820 and who played important roles in the Reform War and French intervention in Mexico
San Antonino El Alto and seven other municipalities named San Antonino – Saint Anthony of Padua
San Baltazar Chichicapam and two other municipalities named San Baltazar – Balthazar, one of the biblical Magi (Three Wise Men)
San Bartolo Coyotepec and two other municipalities named San Bartolo – Bartholomew the Apostle
San Bartolomé Ayautla and four other municipalities named San Bartolomé – Bartholomew the Apostle
San Blas Atempa – Saint Blaise
San Carlos Yautepec – Saint Charles
San Cristóbal Amatlán and three other municipalities named San Cristóbal – Saint Christopher
San Dionisio del Mar and three other municipalities named San Dionisio – Pope Dionysius (AD 259–268)
San Esteban Atatlahuca – Saint Stephen (AD 5–34), first Christian martyr
San Felipe Jalapa de Díaz – Philip the Apostle and Porfirio Díaz, president seven times (1877–1880 and 1884–1911)
San Felipe Tejalapam and San Felipe Usila – Philip the Apostle
San Francisco Cahuacúa and 15 other municipalities named San Francisco – Francis of Assisi, founder of the Franciscan Order
San Ildefonso Amatlán, San Ildefonso Sola, and San Ildefonso Villa Alta – Saint Ildefonsus (AD 607–667), archbishop of Toledo, Spain
San Jacinto Amilpas and San Jacinto Tlacotepec – Saint Hyacinth, a Roman martyr
San Jerónimo Coatlán and five other municipalities named San Jerónimo – Saint Jerome (c. 345–420), priest who translated the Bible into Latin
San Jorge Nuchita – Saint George (d. AD 303), soldier immortalized in the legend of Saint George and the Dragon
San José Ayuquila and eight other municipalities named San José – Saint Joseph
San Juan Achiutla and 40 other municipalities named San Juan – Saint John
San Juan Bautista Atatlahuca and ten other municipalities named San Juan Bautista – John the Baptist
San Lorenzo, Oaxaca and nine other municipalities named San Lorenzo – Saint Lawrence (AD 225–258), deacon of Rome
San Lucas Camotlán, San Lucas Ojitlán, San Lucas Zoquiapam – Luke the Evangelist
San Luis Amatlán – Saint Louis IX of France
San Marcial Ozolotepec – :es:Marcial de Limoges (d. AD 273), bishop of Roman Catholic Diocese of Limoges
San Marcos Arteaga – Mark the Evangelist
San Martín de los Cansecos and seven other municipalities named San Martín – Saint Martin of Braga (c. 520–580), archbishop of Bracara Augusta in Gallaecia
San Mateo Cajonos and seven other municipalities named San Mateo – Matthew the Apostle
San Melchor Betaza – Melchor, one of the Biblical Magi
San Nicolás, Oaxaca and San Nicolás Hidalgo – Saint Nicholas and Miguel Hidalgo
San Pablo Coatlán and eight other municipalities named San Pablo – Paul the Apostle
San Pedro Amuzgos and 36 other municipalities named San Pedro – Saint Peter, apostle and first pope
San Pedro y San Pablo Ayutla, San Pedro y San Pablo Teposcolula, San Pedro y San Pablo Tequixtepec – Saints Peter and Paul
San Raymundo Jalpan – Raymond of Fitero, monk and founder of the Order of Calatrava
San Sebastián Abasolo and seven other municipalities named San Sebastián – Saint Sebastian, early martyr
San Simón Almolongas and San Simón Zahuatlán – Simon the Zealot

Santa Ana to Zimatlán de Álvarez
Santa Ana, Oaxaca and seven other municipalities named Santa Ana – Saint Anne, grandmother of Jesus
Santa Catalina Quierí and seven other municipalities named Santa Catalina – Catherine of Alexandria, virgin and martyr
Santa Gertrudis Municipality – Gertrude the Great (1256–1302), Benedictine nun and theologian
Santa Inés del Monte and Santa Inés Yatzeche – Agnes of Rome (AD 291–304), virgin and martyr
Santa Inés de Zaragoza – Ignacio Zaragoza (1829–1862), Mexican military commander of the 19th century
Santa Lucía del Camino and three other municipalities named Santa Lucía – Saint Lucy of Syracuse (AD 283–304)
Santa Magdalena Jicotlán – Mary Magdalene
Santa María Alotepec and 52 other municipalities named Santa María – Mary, mother of Jesus
Santa María Jalapa del Marqués – Hernán Cortés (1485–1547), 1st Marquess of the Valley of Oaxaca
Santa María Chilapa de Diaz – Lorenzo Cortéz y Salazar, landowner
Santiago Amoltepec and 52 other municipalities named Santiago – James the Great, apostle and patron of Spain
Santo Domingo Albarradas and 19 other municipalities named Santo Domingo – Saint Dominic (1170–1221), founder of the Dominican Order
Santos Reyes Nopala and four other municipalities named Santos Reyes – the Three Kings
Santo Tomás Jalieza and three other municipalities named Santo Tomás – Thomas the Apostle
San Vicente Coatlán, San Vicente Lachixío, San Vicente Nuñú – Vincent of Saragossa (d. c. AD 304), deacon and martyr
Tataltepec de Valdés – Antonio Valdés (d. 1811), soldier in the War of Independence who was born in the town
Teococuilco de Marcos Pérez – Marcos Pérez
 Teotitlán de Flores Magón – Ricardo Flores Magón and Enrique Flores Magón
Tepelmeme Villa de Morelos – José María Morelos
Tlacolula de Matamoros – Mariano Matamoros (1770–1814), priest and general in the War of Independence
Totontepec Villa de Morelos – José María Morelos
Unión Hidalgo – Miguel Hidalgo
 Villa Díaz Ordaz – José María Díaz Ordaz, politician
Villa de Tututepec de Melchor Ocampo – Melchor Ocampo (1814–1861), radical liberal and diplomat (McLane–Ocampo Treaty)
Yutanduchi de Guerrero – Vicente Guerrero
Zimatlán de Álvarez – Juan Álvarez, caudillo who fought in the War of Independence and the Pastry War, liberal president (1855)

Puebla

Acatlán to Rafael Lara Grajales
Acatlán de Osorio – Joaquín Osorio
Acatzingo de Hidalgo – Miguel Hidalgo y Costilla (1753–1811), initiator of the Mexican War of Independence
Albino Zertuche and Acaxtlahuacán de Albino Zertuche – Albino Zertuche
Ayotoxco de Guerrero, Totoltepec de Guerrero, Vicente Guerrero, Puebla – Vicente Guerrero (1782–1831), leader of the Mexican War of Independence and 2nd president (1829)
Cañada Morelos Municipality and Morelos Cañada – José María Morelos (1765–1815), leader of the Mexican War of Independence
 Carmen Serdán – Carmen Serdán, a Mexican Revolutionary heroine
 Ciudad Serdán – Aquiles Serdán leader of the Mexican Revolution
 Cuapiaxtla de Madero – Francisco I. Madero (1873–1913), initiator of the Mexican Revolution and president (1911-1913)
 Domingo Arenas – Revolutionary Domingo Arenas (1888–1916)
 Emilio Portes Gil (Puebla) – Emilio Portes Gil, President of Mexico (1928–1930)
 Francisco Z. Mena – Francisco Zacarias Mena (1841–1910), general
 General Felipe Ángeles – Felipe Ángeles (1868–1919), Revolutionary general
 Guadalupe Victoria, Puebla – Guadalupe Victoria (1786–1843), general and first president (1824–1829)
Hermenegildo Galeana, Puebla, Tuzamapan de Galeana – Hermenegildo Galeana (1762–1814), general in the War of Independence
Huitzilan de Serdán – Aquiles Serdán (1876–1910), Maderista Mexican politician and revolutionary from Puebla who took part in the first action of the Mexican Revolution
Izúcar de Matamoros (municipality) – Mariano Matamoros (1770–1814), Lieutenant general who won the Battle of Izúcar in the War of Independence
 Juan C. Bonilla (municipality) – Juan Crisóstomo Bonilla
Juan Galindo (municipality) – Juan Galindo (1840–1888), liberal coronel born in Cuacuila, Puebla, who led the Batalion of Huauchinango at the Battle of Puebla
Juan N. Méndez (municipality), Zapotitlán de Méndez – Juan N. Méndez, liberal general, governor of Puebla (1863, 1867), Porfiriast, president (1876–1877)
Rafael J. García – Rafael J. García, liberal politician
Lafragua – José María Lafragua (1813–1875), liberal lawyer born in Puebla (city)
La Magdalena Tlatlauquitepec – Mary Magdalene
Nicolás Bravo (municipality), Palmar de Bravo, Xayacatlán de Bravo – Nicolás Bravo (1786–1854), general during the Mexican–American War and president (1839, 1842–1843, 1846)
 Rafael Lara Grajales – Rafael Lara Grajales, a revolutionary who was assassinated in 1933

San Andrés to Santo Tomás
San Andrés Calpan, San Andrés Cholula (municipality) – Andrew the Apostle
San Buenaventura Nealticán – Giovanni di Fidanza (1221–1274), medieval Franciscan, scholastic theologian and philosopher
San Diego la Meza Tochimiltzingo – Didacus of Alcalá (d. 1463), missionary to the Canary Islands
San Felipe Teotlalcingo, San Felipe Tepatlán – Philip the Apostle
San Francisco Mixtla – Francis of Assisi, founder of the Franciscan Order
San Gregorio Atzompa – Pope Gregory I
San Jerónimo Tecuanipan, San Jerónimo Xayacatlán – Saint Jerome, translator of the Bible into Latin
San José Acateno – Saint Joseph
San Juan Epatlán and four other municipalities named San Juan – Saint John
San Martín Atexcal, San Martín Texmelucan, San Martín Totoltepec – Martin of Braga
San Matías Tlalancaleca – Saint Matthias (died c. AD 80)
San Nicolás Buenos Aires – Saint Nicholas
San Pablo Anicano – Paul the Apostle
San Pedro Cholula, San Pedro Yeloixtlahuaca – Saint Peter
San Salvador el Seco, San Salvador Huixcolotla, San Salvador Huixcolotla – Jesus
San Sebastián Tlacotepec, San Sebastián Zinacatepec – Saint Sebastian (c. AD 256–288), Christian saint and martyr
San Vicente Coyotepec – Vincent of Saragossa
Santa Catarina Tlaltempan – Catherine of Siena (1347–1380), a lay member of the Dominican Order
Santa Clara Huitziltepec, Santa Clara Ocoyucan – Clare of Assisi (1194–1253), founder of the Poor Clares
Santa Inés Ahuatempan – Agnes of Rome
Santa Isabel Cholula – Elizabeth, mother of John the Baptist
Santa María Cohetzala, Santa María Coronango, Santa María Coyomeapan – Mary, mother of Jesus
Santa Rita Tlahuapan – Rita of Cascia (1381–1457) Augustinian nun
Santiago Atzitzihuacán, Santiago Miahuatlán – James the Great
Santo Domingo Huehuetlán – Saint Dominic, founder of the Dominican Order
Santo Tomás Hueyotlipan (municipality) – Thomas the Apostle

Tepango de Rodriguez to Xochitlan
 Tepango de Rodriguez Municipality – Abelardo L. Rodríguez, president (1932–1934)
 Tepeyahualco de Cuauhtemoc – Cuauhtémoc, last Aztec ruler (tlatoani) of Tenochtitlan (1520–1521)
Tetela de Ocampo (municipality) – Melchor Ocampo (1814–1861), liberal politician and diplomat
 Teteles de Avila Castillo – Manuel Avila Castillo, father of President Manuel Ávila Camacho (1940-1946)
 Tlacotepec de Benito Juárez, Los Reyes de Juárez, Mazapiltepec de Juárez, Xicotepec de Juárez –Benito Juárez, Liberal Party president (1858–1872)
 Venustiano Carranza Municipality, Puebla – Venustiano Carranza, president who was assassinated in Tlaxcalatongo, Puebla in 1920
 Villa Ávila Camacho– Rafael Ávila Camacho (1904–1975), Governor of Puebla
 Villa Lázaro Cárdenas – Lázaro Cárdenas, military and statesman
 Xochitlán de Vicente Suárez – Vicente Suárez (born in Puebla, Puebla, 1833), hero of Battle of Chapultepec (1847)

Querétaro
 Amealco de Bonfil – Alfredo Vladimir Bonfil (1936–1973), a peasant leader
 Cadereyta de Montes – Lope Díez de Armendáriz, 1st Marquess of Cadreita and Ezequiel Montes, lawyer and politician
 Colón, Querétaro – Christopher Columbus
 Corregidora Municipality – Josefa Ortiz de Domínguez
 Ezequiel Montes, Querétaro – :es:Ezequiel Montes Ledesma (1820–1883), politician and diplomat
 Jalpan de Serra – Fray Junípero Serra
 Landa de Matamoros – Mariano Matamoros
 Pedro Escobedo – Dr. Pedro Escobedo (1798–1844)
San Joaquín Municipality, Querétaro – Joachim, grandfather of Jesus
Santiago de Querétaro – James the Great
San Juan del Río Municipality, Querétaro – Saint John

Quintana Roo
 Benito Juárez, Quintana Roo – Benito Juárez
 Carlos A. Madrazo – Carlos A. Madrazo (1915–1969), Governor of Tabasco (1959–1964)
 Felipe Carrillo Puerto, Quintana Roo – Felipe Carrillo Puerto, socialist leader
 Javier Rojo Gómez – Javier Rojo Gómez (1896–1970), lawyer and politician
 José María Morelos, Quintana Roo, Puerto Morelos – José María Morelos, leader of the Mexican War of Independence
 Lázaro Cárdenas, Quintana Roo – Lázaro Cárdenas, president (1934–1940)
 Othón P. Blanco, Quintana Roo – Othón P. Blanco Núñez de Cáceres (1868–1959), founder of Chetumal

San Luis Potosí
 Adolfo López Mateos – Adolfo López Mateos, President of Mexico (1958-1964)
 Ahualulco de Sonido 13 – Julián Carrillo (1875–1965), composer
 Armadillo de los Infante – Named for the Infante family, who owned the first printing business in the state
 Axtla de Terrazas – Alfredo M. Terrazas, revolutionary
 Cárdenas, San Luis Potosi – Luis de Cardenas (founder)
 Cerro de San Pedro – Saint Peter
 Ciudad Fernández – Zenón Fernández (1792–1833), general who supported a federal government
 Ildefonso Turrubiartes (San Luis Potosi) – General Ildefonso Turrubiartes (1890–1963)
 Mexquitic de Carmona – General Damian Carmona
 Moctezuma, San Luis Potosí – General José Esteban Moctezuma
 Rayón, San Luis Potosí – Ignacio López Rayón (1773–1832), leader during the War of Independence
 Real de Catorce – Named to honor 14 Spanish soldiers killed during the Chichimeca War (1550–90)
 Salinas de Hidalgo, Villa de Hidalgo, San Luis Potosí – Miguel Hidalgo
 San Ciro de Acosta – Saint Cyrus (d. c. AD 307), martyr and revolutionary Miguel Acosta (1891–1947)
 San Luis Potosí City – King Louis IX of France
San Martín Chalchicuautla – Martin of Braga (AD 520–580)
San Nicolás Tolentino – Saint Nicholas of Myra (c. AD 270–343), bishop
San Vicente Tancuayalab – Vincent Ferrer (1350–1419), Valencian Dominican missionary and logician
Santa Catarina, San Luis Potosí – Catherine of Siena (1347–1380), mystic, lay member of the Dominican Order
Santa María del Río, San Luis Potosí, Villa de Guadalupe, San Luis Potosí – Mary, mother of Jesus
Santo Domingo, San Luis Potosí – Saint Dominic (1170–1221), founder of the Dominican Order
 Soledad de Graciano Sánchez – Prof. Graciano Sánchez Romo (1888–1957), a Mexican peasant and politician and founder of Peasant National Confederation
Tancanhuitz de Santos – :es:Pedro Antonio de los Santos Rivera (1887–1913), supporter of the Anti-Re-election Movement (1908–1909)
 Tanquián de Escobedo – Mariano Escobedo, governor
 Villa de Arista – Mariano Arista, republican and liberal president (1851–1853)
 Villa de Arriaga – Ponciano Arriaga (1811–1865), lawyer and radical liberal politician from San Luis Potosí
Villa de Hidalgo, San Luis Potosí – Miguel Hidalgo y Costilla (1753–1811), Father of the Nation
 Villa Juárez, San Luis Potosí – Benito Juárez, liberal president (1858-1872)
 Zaragoza, San Luis Potosí – Ignacio Zaragoza, general at the Battle of Puebla (1862)

Sinaloa
 Adolfo Ruiz Cortines (Sinaloa) – President Adolfo Ruiz Cortines
 Alfonso G. Calderón (Sinaloa) – Alfonso Calderón Velarde (1913–1990), Governor of Sinaloa
 Escuinapa de Hidalgo – Miguel Hidalgo
 Gabriel Leyva Solano, (Sinaloa) – Gabriel Leyva Solano (1871–1910), promartyr
 Juan José Ríos, Sinaloa – General Juan José Ríos (1882–1954), revolutionary
 Miguel Alemán (Sinaloa) – Miguel Alemán Valdés
 Salvador Alvarado – Salvador Alvarado, revolutionary
San Ignacio Municipality, Sinaloa – Ignatius of Loyola (1491-1556), founder of the Society of Jesus
 Sinaloa de Leyva –  Gabriel Leyva Solano

Sonora
 Adolfo Oribe de Alva – Ing. Adolfo Orive Alba (1907–2000), Mexican engineer 
 Alejandro Carrillo Marcor (Sonora) – Alejandro Carrillo Marcor (1908–1998), Governor of Sonora
 Benjamín Hill, Sonora – Benjamín G. Hill (1874–1920), military leader during the Mexican Revolution
 Cajeme Municipality – Cajemé (1835–1887), Yaqui indian rebel
 Campodónico (Sonora) – Rodolfo Campodónico, compositor
 Carbó – José Guillermo Carbó, military commander
 Ciudad Obregón – Álvaro Obregón, president (1920–1924)
 Emiliano Zapata (Sonora) – Emiliano Zapata (1879–1919), military leader during the Mexican Revolution
 Hermosillo – José María González Hermosillo
Magdalena de Kino – Father Eusebio Kino (1645–1711), Jesuit, missionary and explorer
 Miguel Alemán (Sonora) – Miguel Alemán Valdés, president (1946–1952)
 Moctezuma, Sonora – Moctezuma Xocoyotzin (1466–1520), ninth tlatoani (ruler) of the Aztec Empire (1502 or 1503–1520)
 Nacozari de García – Jesús García (1881–1907), railroad brakeman who died while preventing a train loaded with dynamite from exploding near Nacozari
 Plutarco Elías Calles, Sonora – Plutarco Elías Calles, president (1924–1928)
 Rayón, Sonora – Ignacio López Rayón (1773–1832), general during the Mexican War of Independence
San Felipe de Jesús Municipality – Philip of Jesus (1572–1597), priest and martyr, first Mexican saint
San Ignacio Río Muerto Municipality – Ignatius of Loyola, co-founder of the Society of Jesus
San Javier Municipality, Sonora – Francis Xavier (1506–1552), co-founder of the Society of Jesus
San Luis Río Colorado Municipality – Louis IX of France
San Pedro de la Cueva Municipality – Saint Peter
Santa Ana Municipality, Sonora – Saint Anne, grandmother of Jesus
 Villa Hidalgo, Sonora – Miguel Hidalgo y Costilla (1753–1811), Father of the Nation
 Villa Juárez, Sonora – Benito Pablo Juárez García (1806-1872), liberal president during the Reform War and Second French intervention in Mexico
 Villa Pesqueira – Ignacio Pesqueira Garcia

Tabasco
 Benito Juárez (Macuspana) – Benito Juárez, president (1858–1872)
 Cárdenas, Tabasco – José Eduardo de Cárdenas (1765–1821) priest, theologian, and politician
 Carlos A. Madrazo (Tabasco) – Carlos A. Madrazo (1915–1969), governor (1959–1964)
 Carlos Pellicer Cámara (Tabasco) - Carlos Pellicer Cámara, poet
 Carlos Rovirosa (Tulipán) – Carlos Rovirosa (1901–1930), an aviator pilot
 Ejido Gustavo Diaz Ordaz (Tabasco) – Gustavo Díaz Ordaz, president 
 Emiliano Zapata Municipality, Tabasco – Emiliano Zapata, revolutionary general
 Francisco J. Santamaria (Jalapa) – Francisco Javier Santamaria (1886–1963), governor
 Jalpa de Méndez – Coronel Gregorio Mendez Magana, who fought against the Second French intervention in Mexico
 Luis Gil Pérez (Tabasco) – Professor Luis Gil Pérez (1871–1911)
 Sánchez Magallanes – Coronel Andrés Sánchez Magallanes, a leader in the French Intervention in Mexico
 Tenosique de Pino Suárez – José María Pino Suárez, Vice President of Mexico under Francisco I. Madero (1911–1913)
 Venustiano Carranza (Tabasco) – Venustiano Carranza, president (1916–1920)

Tamaulipas
 Abasolo, Tamaulipas – Mariano Abasolo
 Aldama, Tamaulipas – Juan Aldama, leader of the Mexican War of Independence
 Antiguo Morelos Municipality, Nuevo Morelos, Tamaulipas – José María Morelos, leader of the Mexican War of Independence
 Bustamante Municipality – Anastasio Bustamante
 Ciudad Madero – Francisco I. Madero, initiator of the Mexican Revolution and president (1911–1913)
 Ciudad Mier – Servando Teresa de Mier (1765–1827), priest and politician during the Mexican War of Independence
 Ciudad Miguel Alemán – Miguel Alemán Valdés, president
 Ciudad Victoria – Guadalupe Victoria, first president
 Gómez Farías Municipality, Tamaulipas – President Valentín Gómez Farías, president
 Gustavo Díaz Ordaz, Tamaulipas – Gustavo Díaz Ordaz, president (1964–1970)
Hidalgo, Tamaulipas – Miguel Hidalgo y Castillo, initiator of the Mexican War of Independence
Jiménez, Tamaulipas – Colonel Juan Nepomuceno Jiménez (b. 1787), leader of the Mexican War of Independence
 Mainero, Tamaulipas – General Guadalupe Mainero Juárez (1856–1901), governor
 Marte R. Gómez (Tamaulipas) – Ing. Marte R. Gómez (1896–1973), governor
 Matamoros, Tamaulipas – Mariano Matamoros, leader of the Mexican War of Independence
 Nueva Ciudad Guerrero – Vicente Guerrero, leader of the Mexican War of Independence
Ocampo, Tamaulipas – Melchor Ocampo, liberal politician and diplomat
San Carlos Municipality, Tamaulipas – Charles of Sezze (1613–1670), friar of the Franciscan Order
San Fernando, Tamaulipas – Ferdinand III of Castile
San Nicolás Municipality, Tamaulipas – Saint Nicholas, bishop
 Úrsulo Galván (Tamaulipas) – Úrsulo Galván Reyes (1893–1930)
 Xicoténcatl, Tamaulipas – Xicotencatl II (d. 1522), Tlacochcalcatl (prince) and warlord of Tizatlan, Tlaxcala

Tlaxcala
 Acuamanala de Miguel Hidalgo – Miguel Hidalgo y Castillo, priest and initiator of the Mexican War of Independence
 Amaxac de Guerrero – Vicente Guerrero, general and leader of the Mexican War of Independence and 2nd president
 Benito Juárez Municipality, Tlaxcala – Benito Juárez, liberal president (1858–1872)
 Emiliano Zapata Municipality, Tlaxcala – Emiliano Zapata (d. 1919), general and leader of the Mexican Revolution
 Ixtacuixtla de Mariano Matamoros – Mariano Matamoros, priest and general of the Mexican War of Independence
 Lázaro Cárdenas Municipality, Tlaxcala, Sanctorum de Lázaro Cárdenas – Lázaro Cárdenas, president (1934–1940)
La Magdalena Tlaltelulco – Mary Magdalen
 Mazatecochco de José María Morelos – José María Morelos, priest and general of the Mexican War of Independence 
 Muñoz de Domingo Arenas – Domingo Arenas (1888–1918), revolutionary from the state of Tlaxcala
 Nanacamilpa de Mariano Arista – Mariano Arista (1802–1855), soldier and president (1851–1853)
 Papalotla de Xicohténcatl, Tlaxcala de Xicohténcatl – Xicotencatl I (1425–1522), tlatoani (king) of Tizatlan, confederacy of Tlaxcala
San Damián Texoloc – Saint Damian (died c. AD 287) Arab physician Christian martyr
San Francisco Tetlanohcan – Francis of Assisi
San Jerónimo Zacualpan – Saint Jerome, translator of the Bible
San Juan Huactzinco, San Juan Totolac – John the Apostle
San Lorenzo Axocomanitla – Saint Lawrence
San Lucas Tecopilco – Luke the Evangelist
San Pablo del Monte – Paul the Apostle
Santa Ana Chiautempan, Santa Ana Nopalucan – Saint Anne, grandmother of Jesus
Santa Apolonia Teacalco – Saint Apollonia (d. AD 249)
Santa Catarina Ayometla – Catherine of Siena, member of the Dominican Order
Santa Isabel Xiloxoxtla – Saint Elizabeth, mother of John the Baptist
 Tepetitla de Lardizabal – Miguel de Lardizabal, statesman
 Zitlaltepec de Trinidad Sánchez Santos – Trinidad Sánchez Santos, politician

Veracruz

Alto Lucero to Mixtla
 Alto Lucero de Gutiérrez Barrios – Fernando Gutiérrez Barrios (governor)
 Alvarado, Veracruz – Pedro de Alvarado
 Ángel R. Cabada – Ángel Rosario Cabada, agrarian leader
 Benito Juárez, Veracruz – Benito Juárez
 Camarón de Tejeda, Chicontepec de Tejeda – Adalberto Tejeda Olivares, Politician
Camerino Z. Mendoza (municipality) – :es:Camerino Z. Mendoza (1879–1913), general during the Mexican Revolution
Carlos A. Carrillo, Veracruz – Carlos A. Carrillo (1855–1893), educator from Córdoba, Veracruz
 Carrillo Puerto (municipality) – Felipe Carrillo Puerto
 Cazones de Herrera – Gral. Vicente Herrera Hernandez (1874–1947)
Chicontepec de Tejeda – Sebastián Lerdo de Tejada, liberal president (1872–1876)
 Chinampa de Gorostiza – Manuel Eduardo de Gorostiza
Ciudad Cuauhtémoc, Veracruz – Cuauhtémoc (c. 1502–1525), last tlatoani (emperor or leader) of the Aztecs
 Cosautlán de Carvajal – Ángel Carvajal Bernal (Governor)
Coscomatepec de Bravo – Nicolás Bravo, general and three-time president
 Emiliano Zapata Municipality, Veracruz – Emiliano Zapata
Filomeno Mata – Filomeno Mata Rodríguez (1845–1911), educator
 Gutiérrez Zamora – Manuel Gutiérrez Zamora
Hueyapan de Ocampo – Melchor Ocampo, liberal intellectual and diplomat
Huiloapan de Cuauhtémoc – Cuauhtémoc, last emperor of the Aztecs
 Ignacio de la Llave (Municipality) – Ignacio de la Llave (governor)
 Ixhuatlán de Madero – Francisco I. Madero
Jáltipan de Morelos – José María Morelos y Pavón (d. 1813), priest and general during the War of Independence
 Jesús Carranza, Veracruz – Jesús Carranza, father of Venustiano Carranza
José Azueta, Veracruz – :es:José Azueta, naval cadet who fought at the Battle of Veracruz in 1914
José Cardel, Veracruz – José Cardel, founder of a sugar-cane mill in 1923
 Juan de la Luz Enriquez, Veracruz – 19th century governor Juan de la Luz Enríquez
Juan Rodríguez Clara – Juan Rodríguez Clara
Juchique de Ferrer – Jaume Ferrer, Majorcan sailor who explored the West African coast
 Landero y Coss – Francisco Landero y Coss (1828–1900), governor of Veracruz
 Lerdo de Tejada – Sebastián Lerdo de Tejada
Magdalena Municipality, Veracruz – Mary Magdalene
Manlio Fabio Altamirano, Veracruz – :es:Manlio Fabio Altamirano Flores (1892–1936), radical politician born in Xalapa
 Marco Antonio Muñoz, Veracruz – Lic. Marco Antonio Muñoz Turnbull (1914–2001), governor of Veracruz
 Mariano Escobedo, Veracruz – Mariano Escobedo
 Minatitlán, Veracruz – Martín Javier Mina y Larrea
 Mixtla de Altamirano – Ignacio Manuel Altamirano

Naolinco to Zontecomatlán
Naolinco de Victoria – Guadalupe Victoria, first president
Ozuluama de Mascareñas (municipality) – Colonel Francisco Esteban Mascareñas, who was born here and fought on the Liberal side in the Reform War
Papantla de Serafin Olarte – Serafin Olarte, guerrilla leader during the War for Independence
 Platón Sánchez – Rafael Platón Sánchez (1831–1867), a native of the area who fought in the Battle of Puebla 
Poza Rica de Hidalgo – Miguel Hidalgo de Castillo, initiator of the War of Independence
Progreso de Zaragoza – Ignacio Zaragoza (1829–1862), military commander at the Battle of Puebla
 Rafael Delgado, Veracruz – Rafael Delgado (author)
Rafael Lucio – Rafael Lucio, doctor from Xalapa
San Andrés Tenejapan, San Andrés Tuxtla – Andrew the Apostle
San Juan Evangelista – John the Evangelist
 Sayula de Alemán – Miguel Alemán Valdés (1900–1983), president (1946–1952), born in Sayula
 Soledad de Doblado – Manuel Doblado, Minister of Foreign Affairs who signed a preliminary peace agreement in Soledad with representatives of England, Spain and France on February 19, 1862
Tatahuicapan de Juárez – Benito Juarez
Tempoal de Sánchez, Veracruz – Rafael Platón Sánchez (1831–1867), a native of the area who chaired the court martial that sentenced Emperor Maximilian to death by firing squad
Tlacotepec de Mejía – José Antonio Mexía (1800-1839), general born in Xalapa who fought at the Anahuac Disturbances in Texas and against Santa Ana in the Battle of Tampico in 1835
Túxpam de Rodríguez Cano – Enrique Rodríguez Cano (d. 1955), native of Tuxpan who was the secretary to President Adolfo Ruiz Cortines
 Úrsulo Galván – :es:Úrsulo Galván Reyes (1893–1930), agrarian leader and member of the Mexican Communist Party born in Tlacotepec de Mejía
Xalapa-Enríquez – Juan de la Luz Enríquez, governor (1884–1892)
Vega de Alatorre – :es:José Flores Alatorre, general during the Mexican Revolution
Villa Aldama – Juan Aldama (1774–1811), captain during the War of Independence and participant in the Cry of Dolores in 1810
Zaragoza, Veracruz – Ignacio Zaragoza (1829–1862), military commander at the Battle of Puebla
Zontecomatlán de López y Fuentes – Gregorio López y Fuentes (b. 1895 in La Huasteca, writer and chronicler of the Mexican Revolution

Yucatán
 Lázaro Cárdenas – Lázaro Cárdenas, president (1934–1940)
 Motul de Carrillo Puerto – Felipe Carrillo Puerto, governor (1922–1924)
 Quintana Roo Municipality – Andrés Quintana Roo (1787–1851), writer, leader of the Mexican War of Independence, liberal politician
San Felipe Municipality, Yucatán – Philip the Apostle
Santa Elena Municipality – Helena, mother of Constantine I (AD c. 247 – c. 330)
 Suma de Hidalgo – Miguel Hidalgo y Costilla (d. 1811), initiator of the War of Independence 
 Tekax de Álvaro Obregón – Álvaro Obregón (1880–1928), president (1920–1924) and President-elect when he was assassinated in 1928

Zacatecas
 Anacleto López – General Anacleto López (1894–1970), chief of military operations in Tepetongo
Calera de Víctor Rosales – Víctor Rosales (1776–1817), one of the thirteen founding fathers of Mexico
 Cuauhtémoc Municipality, Zacatecas – Cuauhtémoc (d. 1521), last emperor of Tenochtitlan
 El Plateado de Joaquín Amaro – Joaquín Amaro, revolutionary
 El Salvador – Jesus
 Florencia de Benito Juárez – Benito Juárez, president
 Genaro Codina – Genaro Codina, composer of the state anthem, "Marcha de Zacatecas"
 General Enrique Estrada – Enrique Estrada (1890–1942) was a general, politician, and Secretary of National Defense.
 General Francisco R. Murguía – Francisco R. Murguía (1873–1922), governor of Zacatecas
 General Juan José Ríos – Juan José Ríos (1882–1954), revolutionary
 General Pánfilo Natera – Pánfilo Natera (1882–1951), revolutionary
Guadalupe Municipality, Zacatecas – Virgin Mary
Jerez de García Salinas – Francisco García Salinas, governor born in Jerez (1829–1834)
 Juan Aldama, Zacatecas – Juan Aldama, a leader of the War of Independence
 Lázaro Cárdenas (Zacatecas) – Lázaro Cárdenas, president (1934–1940)
 Luis Moya, Zacatecas – :es:Luis Moya Regis (1855–1911), revolutionary
 Miguel Alemán, Zacatecas – Miguel Alemán Valdés, president
Miguel Auza Municipality – General Miguel Auza Arrenechea (1822–1892), who was born in Sombrerete and fought in the Reform War and at the 1863 Siege of Puebla
 Manuel Ávila Camacho – Manuel Ávila Camacho, president
 Matías Ramos – Matías Ramos Santos (1891–1962), Secretary of National Defense under Adolfo Ruiz Cortines
 Melchor Ocampo – Melchor Ocampo, liberal politician
 Morelos – Jose Maria Morelos y Pavon (d. 1813), a leader of the War of Independence
 Moyahua de Estrada – Enrique Estrada, revolutionary
 Presa Leobardo Reynoso – Leobardo Reynoso Gutierrez (1902–1993), Governor of Zacatecas
San Cayatano – Saint Cajetan (1480–1547)
San Pedro Piedra Gorda – Saint Peter
 Santa María de la Paz – Mary, mother of Jesus
 Teúl de González Ortega Municipality and Villa González Ortega – Jesús González Ortega (1822–1881), general who defended Puebla during the 1863 siege, governor of Zacatecas
 Trinidad García de la Cadena – José Trinidad García de la Cadena Varela (1893–1886), liberal general from Zacatecas who supported the Plan de la Noria in 1871
 Villa de Cos – Doctor José María Cos, born in Zacatecas in 1770
 Villa García, Zacatecas – Antonio García Salinas, governor
 Villa Hidalgo, Zacatecas – Miguel Hidalgo (d.1811)

References

Mexico
Mexico
Populated places in Mexico